Rabdhure District is a district in the southwestern Bakool region of Somalia.

References

External links
 Administrative map of Rabdhure District

Districts of Somalia